DWARS, GroenLinkse Jongeren is the independent youth wing of GreenLeft, a Dutch green political party.

Ideals and policies
Both the manifest for a better world, the organisation's program of principles and 2025 - DWARS' proposals for the future, the organisation's political program the party lists its five core-ideals which are equal to each other:
Sustainability: DWARS wants to share the Earth's finite resources with future generations. Furthermore, it believes that the rights of animals should be protected. In practice this means that DWARS supports the use of renewable energy, wants to invest in public transport and use the European agricultural subsidies to finance the transition from industrial farming to organic agriculture, DWARS seeks to include animal rights in the Dutch constitution and supports squatting as a means to protest the government's housing policies.
Solidarity: DWARS wants to divide the resources of the world in such a way that every person has the means to develop his or her self. It wants to implement a basic income for all Dutch citizens, shift taxation from labour to capital and support small scale initiatives for non-capitalist economics.
Freedom: DWARS believes that every person should be free to develop his or her self. DWARS wants to make all education in the Netherlands free of charge, equal representation of women and minorities in government positions, government to use open source software and it supports the legalisation of soft drugs.
Democracy: DWARS sees a worldwide federal democracy the ideal form of government. On the first place it seeks to democratize the Netherlands by lowering the age to vote, strengthening the autonomy of municipalities and revert many anti-terrorism laws which infringe basic civil rights.
Peace: DWARS wants to attain worldwide peace by fighting injustice and the sources of war and conflict. In international politics, it wants to abolish NATO and instead it supports European integration, it wants to strengthen the position of the United Nations as forum for peaceful conflict resolution. Furthermore, it wants to invest in third world development with micro-credits to finance small scale projects and by ending protectionist policies of the Western world. It embraces migration as a natural phenomenon.

History

DWARS was founded on 4 January 1991. The foundation was decided on in congress on 15 and 16 December in Wageningen by the PSJG the youth wing of the Pacifist Socialist Party and the Political Party of Radical Youth (PPRJ) the youth wing of the Political Party of Radicals. Because of the merger of these two parties, with the CPN and the EVP, in the GreenLeft, the youth wings were forced to merge too. The General Dutch Youth League, linked to the Communist Party of the Netherlands decided to continue on its own. The Evangelical People's Party did not have an independent youth wing. There were major differences between the two youth organisations. The PSJG was oriented towards actions and campaigning, mainly against nuclear power and weapons. Within the PSJG there was a large anarchist group, which was opposed to parliamentary democracy. The PSJG operated independent from the PSP. The PPRJ was much more moderate and was not opposed to parliamentary democracy. The PPRJ was very dependent on its motherparty, the PPR. This difference between parliamentary oriented members and action-oriented members. In the first ten years of its existence the anarchist PSP youth held a majority, and DWARS became more independent from the GreenLeft. During this period Judith Sargentini was one of the spokespersons of the organisation. Since a few years, the ties with the GreenLeft have been tightened and a more moderate group has come to power.

In the last years DWARS has been oriented towards cooperating with other youth wings of political parties. In 2004 they signed the Pepper-accords, together with ROOD, youth within the Socialist Party and the Young Socialists within the Labour Party, which called for tighter cooperation between the GreenLeft, the Socialist Party and the Labour Party, which would result in a new cabinet, after the next elections. It was called "pepper-accords" in reference to their colour (red) and taste (spicy), because a leftwing government in their view would produce exciting new leftwing policy. In 2001 DWARS signed the Paprika-accords together with the Young Socialists within the Labour Party and the Christian Democratic Youth Appeal, which also called for tighter cooperation between the GreenLeft, the Christian Democratic Appeal and the Labour Party, which would result in a new cabinet, after the 2002 elections. It was called "paprika-accords" in reference to their colours (green, yellow and red), which correspond to the colours of the respective parties. But DWARS has also been able to convince the GreenLeft to stay close to its political ideals, in 2001 the youth wing started a petition under local representatives of the party, calling on the GreenLeft parliamentary party in the House of Representatives to revoke its support for the War against Afghanistan, the petition succeeded.

Name
The name is very difficult to translate. DWARS means both "transverse" and "stubborn" in English, making the translation "contrary" grammatically correct, but it does not cover the short and alternative meaning of the name.

The name was formed after a fierce debate on the founding congress. More moderate participants, who had a history in the PPRJ proposed the name "GreenLeft Youth" ("GroenLinkse Jongeren"), more radical members, with a background in the PSJG proposed "The green spider in the left-hand corner of the chamber, staring to the right" ("De groene spin, die vanuit de linkerhoek, rechts de kamer intuurt). Both sides tried to sabotage the decision making, then the chairman jumped on the table and yelled: "You bunch of contrary minded people, be serious!" ("En stelletje dwarskoppen, nu serieus!"). The name DWARS stuck. The spider however remained an important symbol in the organisation, being the youth wing's logo for a while, and later the youth wing's magazine and email list.

Organisation
DWARS has approximately 3,000 members, most of which are also members of the GreenLeft. It has a board of eight members. The congress convenes twice a year, and elects a new board every year and sets the lines for the political course and can amend on the youth wings constitution. DWARS publishes the independent magazine OverDWARS (a pun meaning both "across" and about DWARS) and uses emaillists to communicate to its members, one of those is called "the Spider" ("de Spin") and the other the DWARSdoorsnee (a pun on the organisations name, meaning cross section)

Older forms of organisation
For a long period, DWARS did not have a chairperson or a board. It was organised according to anarchist principles.

Between 1991 and 1996 DWARS was a collection of campaigning groups with a fast changing composition. The most important groups were the UFO (a pun on the term UFO and Uitermate Fantasievol Overleg "Extremely Fantastic Council") which functioned as board, the ParGo (the Parliamentary Group), which was oriented towards the GreenLeft parliamentary party, Dodo (like the extinct animal) which addressed environmental issues, the Anti-Fa-working group, which followed organisations on the extreme right. DWARS published two magazines, "the Spider" and the "Former Disaster" ("Voorheen RamPSPoed", a continuation of the magazine of the PSJG, which incorporated the acronym of the motherparty, PSP).

Between 1996 and 1999 a crisis board took over, and in 1999 they proposed a new anarchist organisation, with executive working groups ("Uitvoerende Werkgroepen"), in which all members could join, of which representatives would come together in the coordinating council ("Coordinerend Overleg"). These representatives would function as board members and were directly elected on congresses. The coordinating council was joined by the Shadow Parliamentary Party ("Schaduwfractie") which followed the GreenLeft parliamentary party, later this group was called Youth Parliamentary Party (Jongerenfractie). This organisation was maintained until 2005, when the coordinating council and the youth parliamentary party merged to form a single board. Until 2007 it had two chairpersons, one for organisational matters and one for political affairs.

International
DWARS is a member of Federation of Young European Greens (FYEG). For a short while they were member of European Network of Democratic Young Left (ENDYL).

References

External links
 DWARS - official website

Youth wings of political parties in the Netherlands
Youth wings of green parties in Europe
Environmental organisations based in the Netherlands
GroenLinks
1991 establishments in the Netherlands